The Rundle Group is a stratigraphical unit of Mississippian age in the Western Canadian Sedimentary Basin. 

It takes the name from Mount Rundle (itself taking the name from Robert Terrill Rundle), and was first described in outcrops at the northern side of the mountain in Banff National Park by R.J.W. Douglas in 1953.

Lithology
The Rundle Group consists of massive limestone interbedded with dark argillaceous limestone. Chert nodules are observed in the shaley beds, and crinoids and brachiopods are observed in the clean massive beds. Dolimitization is observed in the Elkton Member of the Turner Valley Formation.

Distribution
It thins out toward east and north and is completely eroded or absent in east central and only the lower part occurs in southern Alberta.

Relationship to other units

The  Rundle Group is disconformably overlain by the Rocky Mountain Formation in the front ranges of the Canadian Rockies and by the Fernie Formation in the foothills and by Cretaceous beds in the prairies. It conformably overlies the Banff Formation.

The Rundle Group can be correlated with the Mission Canyon Formation in southern Saskatchewan, northeastern Montana and North Dakota.

Subdivisions
The Rundle Group comprises the Mount Head Formation and Livingstone Formation in the Rocky Mountains; by the Turner Valley Formation, Shunda Formation and Pekisko Formation in the foothills and plains. It is equivalent to the Debolt Formation  and Prophet Formation in north-eastern British Columbia and west-northern Alberta. Debolt, Shunda and Pekisko Formations are staked in the Fort Nelson area.

Canadian Rockies

Foothills and plains

Deep basin

References

Stratigraphy of Alberta
Stratigraphy of British Columbia